Peter Hunter Blair (22 March 1912 – 9 September 1982) was an English academic and historian specializing in the Anglo-Saxon period. In 1969 he married his third wife, the children's author Pauline Clarke. She edited his Anglo-Saxon Northumbria in 1984.

Life
He was the son of Charles Henry Hunter Blair and his wife Alice Maude Mary France. He was educated at Durham School and Emmanuel College, Cambridge.

Hunter Blair was a fellow of Emmanuel College and Reader in the Department of Anglo-Saxon, Norse and Celtic, University of Cambridge.

Selected publications 

 (Reprint of essays by Peter Hunter Blair published 1939 to 1976)

See also
A History of England

References

Bibliography

External links 

 

1912 births
1982 deaths
Anglo-Saxon studies scholars
20th-century British historians
Fellows of the British Academy